Laura Conter (born 29 November 1934) is an Italian diver. She competed in the women's 10 metre platform event at the 1960 Summer Olympics.

References

1934 births
Living people
Italian female divers
Olympic divers of Great Britain
Divers at the 1960 Summer Olympics
Sportspeople from Turin